Kim Yong-jun (김용준) is a Korean name consisting of the family name Kim and the given name Yong-joon, and may also refer to:

 Kim Yong-jun (singer) (born 1984), South Korean singer
 Kim Yong-joon (voice actor), South Korean voice actor
 Kim Yong-jun (footballer) (김영준; born 1983), North Korean footballer
 Kim Yong-jun (politician), North Korean politician
 Kim Yong-jun (art critic) (1904-1967)

See also
 Kim Young-jun (disambiguation)